The men's 400 metres hurdles event was part of the track and field athletics programme at the 1924 Summer Olympics. The competition was held on Sunday, July 6, 1924, and on Monday, July 7, 1924. Twenty-three hurdlers from 13 nations competed. The maximum number of athletes per nation was 4. The event was won by Morgan Taylor of the United States, the fifth consecutive victory by an American in the event. Erik Wilén received silver (following the disqualification of Charles Brookins), Finland's first medal in the men's 400 metres hurdles. Another American, Ivan Riley, took bronze.

Background

This was the fifth time the event was held. It had been introduced along with the men's 200 metres hurdles in 1900, with the 200 being dropped after 1904 and the 400 being held through 1908 before being left off the 1912 programme. However, when the Olympics returned in 1920 after World War I, the men's 400 metres hurdles was back and would continue to be contested at every Games thereafter.

One of the six finalists from the 1920 Games returned: fourth-place finisher Géo André of France. The event, a very unusual one before 1920, was becoming more common; the AAU had added it to its programme. Morgan Taylor was the AAU champion and U.S. trials winner.

Argentina, Chile, Denmark, Greece, and Italy each made their debut in the event. The United States made its fifth appearance, the only nation to have competed at every edition of the event to that point.

Competition format

The competition featured the three-round format introduced in 1908: quarterfinals, semifinals, and a final. Ten sets of hurdles were set on the course. The hurdles were 3 feet (91.5 centimetres) tall and were placed 35 metres apart beginning 45 metres from the starting line, resulting in a 40 metres home stretch after the last hurdle.

There were 6 quarterfinal heats, with between 3 and 5 athletes each. The top 2 men in each quarterfinal advanced to the semifinals. The 12 semifinalists were divided into 2 semifinals of 6 athletes each, with the top 3 in each semifinal advancing to the 6-man final.

As with all other races the track was 500 metres in circumference.

Records

These were the standing world and Olympic records (in seconds) prior to the 1924 Summer Olympics.

Morgan Taylor won the U.S. trials in a time of 52.6 but he also knocked over a hurdle, which was against the rules in force at that time. He did the same in the final of this competition so the time he set, again 52.6, was also not ratified as world record. As the second placed Erik Wilén used a similar style his 53.8 were also not accepted as world record but tolerated as Olympic record.

Schedule

Results

Quarterfinals

All heats were held on Sunday, July 6, 1924.

The best two finishers of every heat qualified for the semifinals.

Quarterfinal 1

Quarterfinal 2

Quarterfinal 3

Quarterfinal 4

Quarterfinal 5

Quarterfinal 6

Semifinals

All semifinals were held on Sunday, July 6, 1924.

The best three finishers of each heat qualified for the final.

Semifinal 1

Semifinal 2

Final

The final was held on Monday, July 7, 1924.

Frederick Blackett was disqualified for two false starts. After the race, Morgan Taylor's time was rejected as a world record because he knocked over a hurdle, which was against the rules in force at that time, while Charles Brookins, who had crossed the finish line in second, was disqualified for running out of his lane. As such, Erik Wilén was credited with an Olympic record, but his time was not ratified as world record.

Results summary

References

External links
Olympic Report
 

Men's hurdles 400 metre
400 metres hurdles at the Olympics